Bojan Subotić (Serbian Cyrillic: Бојан Суботић, born December 17, 1990) is a Serbian-Montenegrin professional basketball player for Szolnoki Olaj of the Hungarian NB I/A.

Bojan trained at KK Tivat and FMP youth teams. With FMP he won Nike International Junior Tournament. He began his pro career with Radnički Basket and FMP. He then played two seasons with Crvena zvezda. In July 2013, Subotić signed with Budućnost Podgorica.

During the 2019–20 season, he averaged 8.2 points and 3.9 rebounds per game for Telekom Baskets Bonn. He parted ways with the team on June 23, 2020.

In August 2020 he signed for Szolnoki Olaj of the Hungarian NB I/A and FIBA Europe Cup.

References

External links
 ABA League profile
 Eurobasket.com profile
 FIBA.com profile

1990 births
Living people
ABA League players
Basketball League of Serbia players
BC Kalev/Cramo players
KK Budućnost players
KK Crvena zvezda players
KK FMP (1991–2011) players
KK Radnički FMP players
Korvpalli Meistriliiga players
Montenegrin expatriate basketball people in Serbia
Montenegrin men's basketball players
People from Tivat
Power forwards (basketball)
Serbian men's basketball players
Serbian expatriate basketball people in Estonia
Serbian expatriate basketball people in Germany
Telekom Baskets Bonn players